Guacolda may refer to:
 Chilean submarine Guacolda
 Chilean torpedo boat Guacolda
 Guacolda, wife of Araucanian chief Lautaro
 1993 Guacolda, main-belt asteroid named after Lautaro's wife
 Guacolda Antoine Lazzerini (1908–2015), Chilean mathematician